The Buffalo Fire Department provides fire protection and first responder emergency medical services to the city of Buffalo, New York.

Stations and apparatus 
, the Buffalo Fire Department operates out of nineteen fire stations with 1 Division Chief and 4 Battalion Chiefs.

All truck companies in the BFD are tower ladders with the exception of Truck 4-15

Disbanded fire companies 
There have been multiple fire companies disbanded throughout the history of the Buffalo Fire Department due to budget cuts or department reorganization.
Engine 5 – Emsile & Bristol (torn down)
Engine 6 – Originally located at 700 Seneca St then moved to Smith & Fulton (torn down)
Engine 7 – Lower Terrace & Evans St. (torn down)
Engine 7 - Buffalo Niagara International Airport ( Taken over by NFTA )
Engine 8 –  Chicago St. torn down E-8 relocated to L-8
Engine 9 – 707 Washington St. – disbanded 1978
Engine 10 – 30 Ganson St. – disbanded 2003
Engine 11 – 1195 Niagara St.
Engine 12 – 132 Ellicott St. – disbanded December 1, 1954
Engine 13 – 195 Court St. – disbanded July 1, 1994
Engine 14 – William St. & Casey St. (torn down)
Engine 15 –  Original house torn down at Amherst & Thompson 64 Amherst St.
Engine 16 – 1420 Main St. / 1229 Jefferson Ave. – disbanded 2002
Engine 17 – Rhode Island & Chenango (parking lot of current E-37)
Engine 18 – 1032 Fillmore Ave. – disbanded/reinstated 1982 – disbanded permanently 2002
Engine 24 – 110 Leroy Ave.
Engine 27 – 33 Johnson St. (torn down) – disbanded 1978 to form Rescue 1
Engine 29 (Marine unit) – 315 Ganson St. (torn down)
Engine 30 – Original quarters South Park and Whitfield. Moved to Ladder 10's quarters at Southside and Mesmer, then moved to 517 Southside Pkwy. disbanded/reinstated 1982 – disbanded permanently 1994
Ladder 1 – 707 Washington St. disbanded 1994
Ladder 3 – 303 Spring St. (torn down)
Ladder 8 – Original house on Chicago St still standing 315 Ganson St. – disbanded 1976
Ladder 9 – 376 Virginia St. – disbanded March 2004
Ladder 11 – 636 Fillmore Ave.
Ladder 12 – 395 Amherst St.
Ladder 16 – 939 Abbott Rd. – disbanded 1976
Rescue 2 – Rhode Island & Chenango St. disbanded 1994
Rescue 3 – 33 Johnson St. Was a two-piece company with Engine 27, not a company, Engine 27 was closed to establish Rescue 1
B41 (Battalion 1) – 132 Ellicott St. – now the Safety Chief, operates out of 195 Court, responds to 2nd alarm or greater
B42 (Battalion 2) – 707 Washington St. – now the Training Bureau Chief, operates out of Buffalo Fire Training Academy on Broadway in Cheektowaga
B45 (Battalion 5) – 273 Kehr St.
South Division Chief – 700 Seneca St.
Squads were Second Piece to Host Engine Co.
Squad 1 – 132 Ellicott St.
Squad 2 – 517 Southside Pkwy.
Squad 3 – 33 Johnson St., was Heavy Rescue 3, With E27 E27 disbanded to create Rescue 1
Squad 4 – 2025 Bailey Ave.
Squad 5 – 500 Rhode Island St.
Squad 6 – 110 Leroy Ave.
Squad 7 – 64 Amherst St.
Squad 8 – 700 Seneca St.
Squad 9 – 707 Washington St.
Squad 10 – 1032 Fillmore Ave.
Squad 11 – 310 Jersey St.
Quad 6 – 131 Southside Pkwy.
Chemical 5 – 166 Cleveland Ave.
Water Tower 1 – 195 Court St.
Water Tower 2 – 195 Court St.

References 

 
Fire departments in New York (state)
1880 establishments in New York (state)
Government of Buffalo, New York